Aulakh is a small village in Punjab, India. It lies in the tahsil (sub-district) of Malout and in the district of Sri Muktsar Sahib. As a very small village, it has an estimated population of only 2500. The place has three religious places, comprising one gurdwara sahib and two other places.

Demographics
As of 2011, the village had a total population of 2576, comprising  1365 males and 1211 females. The sex ratio in the village is 885 females per 1000 males. The literate ratio in the village is 200 for males and 55 for females.

Education
In terms of education, this village is a hub for all the other villages in the neighborhood. Aulakh has one government school  and four other private schools.

References

External links

Articles containing potentially dated statements from 2001
All articles containing potentially dated statements
Villages in Sri Muktsar Sahib district